George Liston (29 April 1860 – 6 June 1929) was an Australian cricketer. He played in one first-class match for South Australia in 1887/88.

See also
 List of South Australian representative cricketers

References

External links
 

1860 births
1929 deaths
Australian cricketers
South Australia cricketers
Cricketers from Adelaide